The effects of Tropical Storm Agatha in Guatemala were some of the worst from a tropical cyclone in the country on record, which included 182 deaths and nearly a billion dollars in damage. The storm rapidly formed and make landfall as a weak tropical storm on May 29, however, destructive floods contributed to mudslides and sinkholes affected the country until June 1, causing extensive damage.

Background

Tropical Storm Agatha was first identified as a trough of low pressure of the western coast of Costa Rica on May 24, 2010. Over several days, the system gradually developed deep convection around its center and was declared a tropical depression on May 29. Within hours, the depression intensified into a tropical storm and was given the name Agatha. Later that day, the system intensified slightly before making landfall near the Mexico–Guatemala border with winds of 45 mph (75 km/h). Once over land, the system began to weaken as convection waned. By the morning of May 30, the center of Agatha moved over the highest terrain in Central America, resulting in the dissipation of the low-level circulation. At this time, the National Hurricane Center ceased advisories on the system but warned that its remnants would continue to produce torrential rains throughout the region.

The eruption prompted officials to shut down the country's international airport for at least five days. Upon the formation of Agatha, people feared that excessive rainfall from the storm could exaggerate the situation and trigger lahars.

Preparations

Upon the formation of Tropical Depression One-E on May 29, the Government of Guatemala declared a tropical storm warning for its entire Pacific coastline. Due to the system's proximity to land, tropical storm force winds were expected to reach the coast by the evening hours, making outdoor preparations difficult. Additionally, the depression's slow movement was expected to cause enormous rainfall totals, exceeding  in some areas. This rain was expected to produce large-scale, life-threatening flash flooding and landslides across Guatemala, El Salvador and southeastern Mexico. Once the system intensified into Tropical Storm Agatha, the National Hurricane Center expected areas to the south and east of the landfall location to experience storm surge along with destructive waves. By the late morning of May 29, Guatemalan officials placed all hospitals on high alert and declared a state of calamity. President Álvaro Colom also began to use some of the $85 million allocated as emergency funds by the World Bank. After the storm moved over land and weakened to a tropical depression, the tropical storm warnings along the coast were discontinued.

Impact

As of June 15, the Government of Guatemala confirmed that 165 people died as a result of Agatha and 113 others were missing. Initially, the death toll was reported to be 174; however, this was revised after the government determined it had counted some persons twice. In terms of infrastructural damage, more than 18,700 were destroyed throughout the country and damage was likely to exceed $1 billion. According to Reuters, more than 100,000 homes were destroyed by the storm, a significantly higher number than stated in other reports. Due to the extensive damage to Guatemala's coffee farms, the crop was expected to be reduced by 3%.

Following the catastrophic damage caused by Agatha, Guatemalan officials began evacuating numerous residents from areas at-risk from flooding and landslides. By May 31, an estimated 150,000 people were relocated, of which 36,000 had been placed in shelters. The number of evacuees gradually rose throughout the following weeks, with a total of 162,857 people having been evacuated.

In Guatemala City, poor drainage in combination with torrential rainfall led to the formation of a massive sinkhole in the middle of a four-way intersection. The geologic formation appeared suddenly and two structures, a three story building and a home, fell into it. Initial reports stated that a security guard died after falling into the hole; however, Guatemalan officials deny this claim.

Across the country, 1,283 schools were badly damaged or destroyed, leading to concerns of when students could actually resume classes.

Aftermath

Immediately following reports of fatalities in Guatemala, a state of emergency was declared for the entire country. Later on, President Álvaro Colom stated that, "We believe Agatha could wreak more damage in the country than Hurricane Mitch and Hurricane Stan". These storms were two of the most devastating tropical cyclones to impact the country, killing 384 and 1,513 people respectively. On May 31, national aid started to be deployed by the government and donation centers for victims of the storm were opened across the country. According to the Office for the Coordination of Humanitarian Affairs (OCHA), schools in Guatemala were to be closed until at least June 4. However, due to the large number of severely damaged or destroyed schools, few buildings can actually allow for classes to take place and 144 of the schools that are intact are being used as shelters.

By June 1, the Government of Guatemala sent an appeal to the United Nations for roughly $100 million in international assistance to deal with damage wrought by Agatha. On June 14, President Colom stated that it would take at least five years to recover from Tropical Storm Agatha due to the widespread nature of the catastrophe. To obtain the necessary resources to recover from the storm, Colom implemented a substantial tax increase. His goal was to increase the revenue from taxes in the country to 9.8% of the gross domestic product.

Throughout the country, roughly 392,600 people were left in need of humanitarian assistance in the wake of Agatha. Most of these people live in rural areas which became isolated from surrounding areas after flood waters washed out roads and destroyed bridges.

International assistance

As Agatha dissipated over Guatemala, the Government of Mexico expressed their sincere condolences to the two countries and offered to provide the necessary support for them to recover. During the afternoon of May 30, as the true scale of the disaster became apparent, Álvaro Colom requested international assistance. However, due to the eruption of Pacaya, the country's international airport was closed and would remain so for at least another week. In an agreement with the president of El Salvador, it was decided that aid would be flown in to El Salvador and transported by ground to Guatemala. However, later reports revealed that two of the four land crossings between the countries were closed off due to flooding and landslides. On May 31, Colombia and the United States offered their assistance by sending aid or helping evacuate residents. By the late morning, six United States military aircraft were en route to Honduras. The Ministry of Foreign Affairs in Taiwan also stated that they would provide aid to Guatemala if necessary.

The Government of France also passed on their condolences to the countries suffering from the disaster and pledged to send emergency humanitarian aid to the region. This was eventually followed up by June 14 when the French embassy in Guatemala provided $50,000 in relief supplies. The initial response from the World Food Programme was to allocate $500,000 to feed 10,000 over a period of 15 days. Other United Nations departments provided much assistance to Guatemala within two days of Agatha's landfall. UNICEF donated roughly $50,000 to support water and sanitation; UNDP allocated $50,000 for assessments and early recovery; the Spanish Agency for International Cooperation for Development provided roughly $185,000 in general humanitarian aid; and the IFRC and UNFPA planned donate $50,000 each. The United States provided immediate funds of GTQ 900,000 ($112,000 USD); USAID also planned to deploy relief teams with food and emergency supplies to bring to those affected by the storm. Additionally, several helicopters from the United States Southern Command were to be deployed in the region.

By June 1, the European Union had sent $3.7 million in aid to Guatemala as well as Honduras and El Salvador. The Save the Children organization began distributing hygiene kits and other relief supplies on June 4. Over the following weeks, they planned to provide 46 metric tons of supplies.

Extensive losses of the country's food supply left tens of thousands of residents without sustenance, leading to fears of widespread hunger in the nation. In attempts to lessen the severity of the hunger outbreak, the WFP set up over 200 shelters across the country and was estimated to be serving 50,000 people a day by June 9. On June 11, the United Nations made an appeal to supply Guatemala with $14.5 million to aid survivors of the storm. This appeal followed a $34 million request for the country prior to the storm for malnutrition incidents. By June 14, the Government of Japan had provided roughly $220,000 worth of equipment and building materials. Around the same time, ACT Development announced that it planned to assist roughly 2,000 families with all basic life necessities for a month. To start this operation, a preliminary appeal was made to the United Nations for $881,000; a second, full appeal was planned to be published on June 20.

See also

Tropical Storm Agatha (2010)
Hurricane Mitch
Hurricane Stan
2010 Pacific hurricane season
List of Pacific hurricanes

References

External links

The National Hurricane Center's Advisory Archive for Tropical Storm Agatha

Hurricanes in Guatemala
2010 in Guatemala
2010 Pacific hurricane season